Ezekwesiri "EJ" Nduka Jr. (born August 28, 1988) is a professional wrestler, professional IFBB bodybuilder, former professional gridiron football and arena football defensive end outside linebacker. As a professional wrestler, he is best known for his time with Major League Wrestling, where he was a former MLW World Tag Team Champion. He previously competed for WWE where he was known as Ezra Judge.

Before signing with the WWE, Nduka was signed by the Toronto Argonauts on February 21, 2013. After college Nduka had several stints with NFL and CFL teams. Ultimately, Nduka was invited to the NFL Combine in 2012 after his senior season of college. He played college football at Sam Houston State University - 2012 National Championship runner-up. Nduka has been a member of the Tri-Cities Fever, Allen Wranglers, Toronto Argonauts and San Antonio Talons.

Nduka is also a professional bodybuilder in the IFBB. Nduka previously completed for the MuscleMania Professional Division. During the World Championships in Vegas, Nduka placed 4th in the Men's Physique Professional Division. Nduka began his bodybuilding career shortly after leaving the AFL in 2016. Since then he has placed 1st in the following competitions: Texas State Championships, Ronnie Coleman Classic, BetterBodies Championship, Junior Nationals and JR USAs. Nduka has also competed at the Arnold Classic & Lou Ferrigno Legacy Classic placing top 3 in the Classic Pro Division. In August 2019 Nduka was signed by the WWE, reporting to their developmental territory NXT.

Early life
Nduka was born in Dallas, Texas, to parents Obie and Prince Nduka, who are originally from Nigeria. EJ Nduka attended Jackson Memorial High School in Jackson, New Jersey. He was a dual sport letterwinner and star in basketball,  and track. He was a star basketball player before ultimately turning to the football field in college.

Football career

College
Nduka began his college career at Jacksonville University in 2007 before transferring to Sam Houston State where he played for three years from 2008 to 2011. He was redshirted as a freshman in 2008 but eventually made an impact for the Bearkats, primarily as a pass rusher in game situations.

Professional leagues

Pre-draft

Prior to the 2012 NFL Draft, Nduka was projected to be undrafted by NFLDraftScout.com. He was rated as the 36th-best outside linebacker in the draft.
Nduka was later signed by the Allen Wranglers of the IFL. In 2012 Nduka played final three games and recorded 15 tackles, three sacks, 1 forced fumble and 1 fumble recovery.

On February 21, 2013, the Toronto Argonauts signed Nduka.  He was released by the Argonauts on May 8, 2013. In 2015, Nduka had private workouts and NFL camps with Texans, Seahawks & Falcons.

Bodybuilding career
Nduka is now a professional athlete in the IFBB a federation. Nduka recently announced via social media that he will now compete in the Classic Physique division in 2017.

IFBB Pro Bodybuilder contest results
2016 IFBB - San Antonio Classic 3rd
2016 IFBB - Lou Ferrigno Classic 3rd
2017 IFBB - IFBB Tournament of Champions 16th
2017 IFBB - Pacific USA Pro 8th
2017 IFBB - Fit World Pro 9th
2017 IFBB - Karina Nascimento Pro 7th
2017 IFBB - Pittsburgh Pro
2018 IFBB - Governors Cup 11th
2018 IFBB - Hawaii Pro 11th
2018 IFBB - Salt City Showdown 8th
2018 IFBB - IFBB City Limits Pro 7th
2018 IFBB - Nebraska Pro 6th

NPC contest results
2015 NPC - BetterBodies Championships 1st
2015 NPC - Ronnie Coleman Classic 1st
2015 NPC - Team Universe 6th
2015 NPC/IFBB - North Americans 4th
2015 NPC - Miami Nationals 3rd
2016 - Jr Nationals 1st
2016 - Jr USAs 1st

Professional wrestling career

WWE (2018–2021)
Because of his performance on the gridiron and on the IFBB stage, in December 2018, Nduka received a tryout with the WWE, and then shortly after went back in April 2019 for another tryout at the WWE Performance Center. After participating on two tryouts (the first in December 2018, the second in April 2019), Nduka signed a contract with WWE on August 15, 2019. He was assigned to the Performance Center and began to work under the ring name of Ezra Judge. On May 19, 2021, Nduka was released from his WWE contract.

Major League Wrestling (2021–2023)
On June 24, 2021, it was revealed as part of their Open Draft that Nduka (now going by his real name) had signed with Major League Wrestling. On July 24, 2021, during Nduka's televised debut, EJ Nduka made a statement within the company as eliminated 12 participants – nearly a third of all Battle Riot participants – breaking the record by a landslide. He would ultimately join Alexander Hammerstone and Richard Holliday as part of The Dynasty. During Wrestlemania 38 weekend Nduka and Calvin Tankman defeated 5150 to become MLW World Tag Team Champions at the Grady Cole Center in North Carolina at a sold out event. On January 7th, 2023 Nduka and Calvin lost their MLW World Tag Team Championships to The Samoan SWAT Team's Juice Finau and Lance Anoa'i at MLW's pay-per-view Blood and Thunder of year 2023. Earlier, it was revealed that Nduka's MLW contract was coming to an end after Blood and Thunder, choosing not to renew it.

Championships and accomplishments
Major League Wrestling
 MLW World Tag Team Championship (1 time) - with Calvin Tankman

References

https://www.prowrestlingsheet.com/wwe-tryout-attendees-ivelisse-photos/
https://solowrestling.mundodeportivo.com/new/83017-wwe-anuncia-las-nuevas-incorporaciones-del-performance-center
 http://contests.npcnewsonline.com/contests/2018/ifbb_city_limits_pro/ej_nduka/

External links

 
 EJ Nduka Sports Illustrated Feature
 EJ Nduka MLW Superstar
 MLW Record - Break out star EJ
 NFL Draft Scout bio
 Sam Houston State University bio
 WWE Performance Center tryout 2018
 WWE Performance Center tryout 2019

1988 births
Living people
African-American bodybuilders
African-American male professional wrestlers
African-American players of American football
African-American players of Canadian football
Allen Wranglers players
American football defensive ends
American football linebackers
American sportspeople of Nigerian descent
Canadian football linebackers
Jackson Memorial High School alumni
Jacksonville Dolphins football players
Players of American football from Dallas
Professional wrestlers from Texas
Sam Houston Bearkats football players
San Antonio Talons players
Sportspeople from Dallas
Toronto Argonauts players
Tri-Cities Fever players
21st-century African-American sportspeople
20th-century African-American people
21st-century professional wrestlers
MLW World Tag Team Champions